Judy and Mary (often stylized as JUDY AND MARY) was a Japanese rock band formed in 1991 in Japan by bassist Yoshihito Onda and vocalist Yuki, with drummer Kohta Igarashi and guitarist Taiji Fujimoto completing the lineup in 1992. Guitarist Takuya replaced Taiji the following year. The band is known for their innovative punk, rock, and pop meldings of noisy but melodic music in the 1990s.

History 
In 1992, Judy and Mary released an album and accompanying video, Be Ambitious, on the independent Chainsaw Records label. The band was soon signed by Epic/Sony Records and released their first major label single, "Power of Love", in 1993. The band's major label debut album, J.A.M, was released in 1994. Judy and Mary quickly became one of the most popular bands in Japan. Their song "Sobakasu" was used as the first opening theme for the anime television series Rurouni Kenshin, and sold over a million copies.

Judy and Mary released seven original albums, three compilation albums (through 2006) and twenty-two singles. The band dissolved in March 2001.

Yuki is now enjoying a successful solo career as YUKI. Takuya is also currently a solo artist. Onda joined the band Hot Rod Crue, but since 2008 has been a member, along with Igarashi, of the band Zamza.

Members
Past members
  =  - vocalist, lyricist
  - bassist, composer
  =  - guitarist, lyricist, composer
  - drums, composer
  - guitarist

Discography

Albums

Studio albums

*positions from 2001 re-release.

Compilation albums

Singles

Books/Publications
 Jam Book (March 15, 1996)
 Yuki Girly Rock -yuki biography- (1997)
 Yuki Girly Swing -yuki autobiography & diary- (1997)
 Yuki Girly Folk -yuki bio- (2000)
 Yuki Girly Boogie -yuki autobio- (2000)
 Yuki Girly Wave -yuki bio- (2004)
 Yuki Girly Tree -yuki autobio) (2004)
 What's In Jam-Pack (memorial compilation of 'What's In' magazine articles)

Bibliography

References

External links
 Judy and Mary Official Website - By Sony Music
 YUKI Official Website - By Sony Music
 Zamza Official Website
 Nippop Profile | Judy and Mary

Sony Music Entertainment Japan artists
Japanese rock music groups
Japanese pop rock music groups
Japanese punk rock groups
Musical groups established in 1992
Musical groups disestablished in 2001
Musical groups from Hokkaido